Lyn(n) Davi(e)s can refer to:
Lynn E. Davis (born 1943), U.S. Under Secretary of State
Lynn Davis (photographer) (born 1944), American photographer
Lynn Davis (singer) (born 1958), American singer
Lynn Davies (born 1942), Welsh long jumper, Olympic gold medalist
Lyn Davis (1943–2008), New Zealand rugby player
Lyn Davies (born 1947), Welsh footballer

See also
Linda Davies (active since 1995), British author